Earth.Revolt is the second full-length album by Deadlock, released in 2005. It is a concept album centering on the theme of Earth being exploited by mankind.

Reception
AllMusic wrote: "The mammoth 'May Angels Come' is 11 minutes of classic metal riffs in the vein of Judas Priest and Iron Maiden before hitting a fine yet tame head-banging groove from the onset. Almost symphonic in its approach and meticulousness, the song is extremely soothing for a metal tune." PopMatters panned Earth.Revolt'''s production, while also calling the album "innocuously pleasant melodic death metal." Exclaim!'' wrote that the band "leech typical riffing and throw in a few metalcore breakdowns to confound the air of dull predictability."

Track listing

 "Demonic (Tonus Dibolus)" (intro) - 0:31
 "10,000 Generations In Blood" - 8:04
 "The Year Of The Crow" - 4:11
 "Everlasting Pain" - 6:45
 "Earth.Revolt" - 4:35
 "More Tragedies To Come" - 6:03
 "Awakened By Sirens" - 5:25
 "Kingdom Of The Dead" - 5:36
 "May Angles Come" - 11:12
 "Harmonic" - 1:49

Personnel 

 Johannes Prem - Male/harsh vocals
 Sabine Scherer (Weniger) - Female/clean vocals
 Sebastian Reichl - Guitar
 Gert Rymen - Guitar
 Thomas Huschka - Bass
 Tobias Graf - Drums

References

2005 albums
Deadlock (band) albums